Martín Ignacio Ferreiro (born 21 October 1997) is an Argentine field hockey player who plays as a forward for German Bundesliga club Crefelder HTC and the Argentine national team.

Club career
Ferreiro played for Lomas in Argentina until 2019. He joined Pinoké in the Dutch Hoofdklasse for the 2019–20 season. After two season in the Netherlands he moved to Belgium to play for Gantoise in Ghent. He only stayed there for one season as he moved to Germany to play for Crefelder HTC in the summer of 2022.

International career
Ferreiro made his debut for the senior national team at the 2018 South American Games. In July 2019, he was selected in the Argentina squad for the 2019 Pan American Games. They won the gold medal by defeating Canada 5-2 in the final. He made his World Cup debut at the 2023 Men's FIH Hockey World Cup.

Honours
Argentina U21
 Pan American Junior Championship: 2016

Argentina
 Pan American Games gold medal: 2019
 Pan American Cup: 2022
 South American Games gold medal: 2018

References

External links

1997 births
Living people
Argentine male field hockey players
Male field hockey forwards
Competitors at the 2018 South American Games
Field hockey players at the 2019 Pan American Games
South American Games gold medalists for Argentina
South American Games medalists in field hockey
Pan American Games gold medalists for Argentina
Pan American Games medalists in field hockey
Men's Hoofdklasse Hockey players
Men's Belgian Hockey League players
Expatriate field hockey players
Argentine expatriate sportspeople in the Netherlands
Place of birth missing (living people)
Medalists at the 2019 Pan American Games
La Gantoise HC players
2023 Men's FIH Hockey World Cup players
21st-century Argentine people
Men's Feldhockey Bundesliga players